Muhammad Haqimi Azim bin Rosli (born 6 January 2003) is a Malaysian footballer who plays as a forward for Malaysia Super League club Kuala Lumpur City and the Malaysia national team.

Club career

Kuala Lumpur City
On 16 April 2022, Haqimi made his Malaysia Super League debut for the club in a 2–0 win over Sabah.

International career
Haqimi has been called up by Kim Pan-gon for the 2022 AFF Championship and made his debut for Malaysia on 24 December 2022 in a 5–0 win over Laos. He also scored his first international goal during that match.

Career statistics

Club

International

References

External links
 
 

2003 births
Living people
Malaysian footballers
People from Selangor
Kuala Lumpur City F.C. players
Malaysia Super League players
Malaysian people of Malay descent
Association football forwards
Malaysia international footballers